Kentucky gained two seats in reapportionment following the 1820 United States Census. Kentucky elected its members August 5, 1822.

See also 
 1822 and 1823 United States House of Representatives elections
 List of United States representatives from Kentucky

Notes 

1822
Kentucky
United States House of Representatives